Keşan is the name of a district of Edirne Province, Turkey, and also the name of the largest in the district town of Keşan (Byzantine Greek: Ρουσιον, Rusion) In 2010 Keşan had a permanent population of 54,314; in the summer this increases to 70,000 because of an influx of tourists. The mayor is Mustafa Helvacıoğlu (AKP).

Keşan district is bordered by İpsala and Uzunköprü to the north, Malkara to the east, Şarköy to the southeast, Gelibolu and the Aegean Sea to the south and Enez to the west.

Agriculture and commerce are the two most important sources of income in Keşan. Because of its proximity to Greece, there is a daily flow of tourists in and out of the district. 

Literacy is 98%.

The local music includes gaida, tupan, and hora dance.

History 
Humans have lived here continuously from the 30th century BC. The first inhabitants were the Proto-Thracian and Thracian tribes. Many Thracian coins of the Odrises have been found here. From 580 BC to 1359 AD first it was a central part of the Odrysian kingdom of Thrace, and after that was ruled by the Persian Empire, the Macedonian Empire, the Roman Empire (including i.е. Byzantine Empire), the Bulgarian Empire, the Byzantine Empire, the Latin Empire, again the Bulgarian Empire and the Byzantine Empire. The Thracian town on Via Egnatia mentioned by Klaudios Ptolemaios and by many others during over of 1900 years before the Turks, have the names: Zorlanis (and Zerlanis, Zorlanae, Zorlanea), Topiris (and Topir, Topiro, Topirion), Kission (and Kissos, Kissan, Kissupolis), Rusion (and Russa, Roussa, Rossion) in Greek ρουζ - rous mean rouge. Here is the place of the remarkable Battle of Rusion where the Bulgarian Tzar Kaloian defeated the Latin empire army in 1206, and again spread the Bulgarian control over the fortress that begin form the first Bulgarian conquest in 538 AD and the next: of khan Zabergan in 559, Bulgarian and Slavs in 617, 623 and 626, Caesar Tervel in 705 and 717-718, Great khan Krum in 813, Tzar Simeon the Great in 896, 913, 921, 922 and 923, Bulgarian troops in 1047, Tzar Ivan Asen II in 1235-1236, Tzar Michail Shishman in 1328. The castle of Rusion was stay on the hill about 4 km southwest of center of the present Kesan and some ruins still exist around 40.826272N 26.679587E at so called "Kaletepe" (tur.- Fortress hill).

Rusion did not fall easily to the Osman Turks, first In 1359 the fortress was taken for a short time by invaders of Gazi Süleyman Paşa before finally being permanently held in 1362 by Lala Şahin Paşa.  In the Ottoman Empire Rusion was renamed to Rusköy (tur. Rus village) a name derived from the medieval fortress-town, and later  to Keşan (from gr. Kissos, Kissupolis). Keşan belonged to the Galipoli Sanjak, and as such was part of the Rumelia Eyalet and then the Province of the Kapudan Pasha. It was a nahiya center in Enez kaza at first, later it was bound to İpsala kaza. It was transferred to the Eyalet of Edirne in 1530. According to the Ottoman population statistics of 1914, the kaza of Keşan had a total population of 30,644, consisting of 15.371 Greeks, 15.221 Muslims, 51 Armenians and 1 Jew.

Keşan was invaded by the Russians in 1829 and in 1878, by the Bulgarians between 1912 and 1913 (on 14 November 1912 Bulgarian Hayrabol detachment commanded by colonel Petar Salabashev take the town  and Tzar Ferdinand reside some days here), by the Greeks between 30 of July 1920 and 1922. It was ceded to Republic of Turkey on 19 November 1922. Keşan district reached its present borders after the separation of nahiya of Enez in 1953. A large part of the population are Bulgarian speaking Muslims, immigrants from Bulgaria and Greece, Roma, and Turkmens.

Notable people
 Selim Sesler (1957–2014), clarinet virtuoso of Romani heritage
 Aleko Trendafilov - volunteer in Thesaloniki detachment of the Bulgarian Macedonian-Adrianopolitan Volunteer Corps, born and resident of Keşan
 Kosta Yanev - volunteer in 3rd company of the 10th Prilep battalion of Bulgarian Macedonian-Adrianopolitan Volunteer Corps, born and resident of Keşan

References

Districts of Edirne Province
Towns in Turkey
Populated places in Edirne Province